Dryadaula terpsichorella, the dancing moth, is a moth of the family Tineidae. It is native to south-eastern Polynesia, Samoa and Fiji, but has also been recorded from Hawaii and more recently from Florida and California. The common name is derived from the characteristic dancelike gyrations it goes through when it alights. It was first described by August Busck in 1910.

Adults are mainly creamy white with some delicate brown, the tips of the forewings are margined with a blackish line that is outwardly edged with white.

Larvae have been found among dead leaves and on other parts of banana, Costus spicatus, ferns, Pandanus, pineapple, sugarcane and other plants. The full-grown larva is about 9–10 mm, cylindrical and very dark brown with two brownish spots on each side of segments three and four. The larva does not spin much silk for its protection, and does not make a cocoon for pupation. The pupa is formed in an irregular network of silk, made on the inner side of the leaf-sheath where the larva has lived. It is about 3.5 mm long and about 1 mm wide. The pupal period lasts seven to nine days.

External links

Dryadaulinae
Moths described in 1910
Moths of New Zealand